Russia is the largest country in the world, located in northern Eurasia.

Russia may also refer to:

Historical states 

 Soviet Union (USSR), the socialist state that existed from 1922 to 1991
 Russian Soviet Federative Socialist Republic (1917–1991), the largest of the fifteen Soviet republics
 Russian Republic (1917), a revolutionary state
 Russian Empire (1721–1917)
 Tsardom of Russia (1547–1721)
 Muscovite Russia (1283–1547)
 Novgorodian Rus' or Novgorod Republic
 Kingdom of Russia (1199–1349), centered in Lviv
 Kievan Rus' (882–1240), centered in Kyiv
 Rus' Khaganate, hypothetical political entity

Places in the United States 
 Russia, Ohio, a village in Shelby County
 Russia, New York, a town in Herkimer County
 Russia, New Jersey, an unincorporated community in Morris County
 Russia Township, Polk County, Minnesota

Other uses
 Russia (ship), the name of several ships
 Russia (horse), an Australian racehorse
 Russia leather, a hard-wearing and water-resistant leather, where birch oil is worked into it after tanning
 Russia! magazine, a quarterly English-language publication about Russia
 232 Russia, a large main belt asteroid
 Team Russia, the 2008–09 Volvo Ocean Race team

See also 
 Great Russia
 Little Russia
 Novorossiya (New Russia)
 New Russia (disambiguation)
 White Russia (disambiguation)
 Black Ruthenia (Black Russia)
 Red Russia (disambiguation)
 Russia Tower, an unfinished skyscraper in Moscow, cancelled in 2009
 Rossiya (disambiguation)
 Rusia (disambiguation)
 Rusya
 Rus (disambiguation)